Andrew Bird (born 1973) is an American musician.

Andrew Bird may also refer to:

Andrew Bird (film editor) (born 1956), British film editor
Andrew Bird (rowing) (born 1967), New Zealand rowing cox
Andy Bird, British executive and former Disney chairman
Andy Bird, British screenwriter and inspiration for Madonna's song "Beautiful Stranger"